TeenStreet is an annual international week-long congress for Christian teenagers between 13 and 17 years old. It is presented by Operation Mobilisation. The first TeenStreet, held in Offenburg, Germany in 1993, hosted about 50 people.  It was part of the Love Europe Congress. Today, over 4,500 teenagers and volunteers attend the German TeenStreet congress each summer. In recent years, TeenStreet events have also been launched and held annually in Uruguay, Brazil, India, South Africa, Malaysia, Australia and Faroe Islands. Each event is coordinated locally by Operation Mobilisation's home offices. Program direction is coordinated internationally, led by Dan & Suzie Potter and Josh & Debs Walker. The Director of TeenStreet International is Peter Magnusson. In the summer of 2007, Josh & Debs Walker assumed the responsibility of program leadership for TeenStreet in Germany. The leadership team for the biggest TeenStreet event in Germany consists of Ger van Veen (Fr), Steffen Zoege (D), Rene Zaensler (D), Janet & Henrik Weber (UK) and Christian Pilz (ES).

TeenStreet was named by Dan & Suzie Potter also known as DUZIE.  The name was created in November 1992 in Poland.  It came as the result of needing a name that would be understood internationally.  The "Teen" part was who it was for, and the "Street" part was about having a why to go. The purpose from the beginning was to motivate and equip Christian teens to have a real friendship with Jesus and reflecting Jesus in their world.

As of August 2010 there have been 46 international TeenStreet congresses.

German themes and locations
 1993: Offenburg – You Can Change Your World 
 1994: Friedrichshafen – Living in an Upside Down World 
 1995: Wolfsburg – Another Day in Paradise
 1996: Mosbach – Original Copy
 1997: Offenburg – Theatre of Life
 1998: Wolfsburg – Dare To Dream
 1999: Offenburg – Inside Out Revolution
 2000: Mosbach – The Image
 2001: Offenburg – Kingdom Come
 2002: Oldenburg – Secrets Revealed
 2003: Offenburg – re:Discovering Jesus
 2004: Oldenburg – Driving At The Speed Of Life
 2005: Münster – Time Machine: Remember The Future
 2006: Offenburg  – Metamorphosis: The Heart of Change
 2007: Oldenburg  – Contagious: Infect Your Sphere
 2008: Oldenburg  – Blindsight
 2009: Offenburg  – Impossible
 2010: Oldenburg  – PS XXIII
 2011: Offenburg  – "REAL"
 2012: Oldenburg  – "NewSong 40"
 2013: Offenburg  – ">>MORE"
 2014: Münster – "OPEN"
 2015: Offenburg  – "Home"
 2016: Oldenburg  – "Life"
 2017: Offenburg  – "Unshakeable"
 2018: Oldenburg  – "CLOSER"
 2019: Offenburg  – "Inspired"

Brazilian themes and locations
 2004: Brazil: Maringá – re:Discovering Jesus (January)
 2005: Brazil: Maringá – Driving At The Speed Of Life (January)
 2006: Brazil: Maringá – Time Machine: Remember the Future (22–27 January 2006)
 2007: Brazil: Maringá – Metamorphosis: The Heart of Change (January)
 2008: Brazil: Maringá Contagious (20–27 January 2008)
 2009: Brazil: Maringá – Blind (26–31 January 2009)
 2010: Brazil: Maringá – Impossible (25–31 January 2010)
 2011: Brazil: Maringá – PS XXIII (17–23 January 2011)

External links
Teenstreet Website
TeenStreet Brazil
TeenStreet Germany with Live Magazine
TiM (Teens in Mission)
Operation Mobilisation
Young-Hope.net
TeenStreet Australia
Teenstreet Faroe Islands
DUZIE

Evangelical parachurch organizations
Christian missions
1993 establishments in Germany
Recurring events established in 1993